Mark Gareth Creasy (born 1944) is a Western Australian mining entrepreneur.

Biography 
Creasy arrived in Australia in the 1960s, and trained as a mining engineer.

He has developed various mining projects in Western Australia and other states.
By 2010 his net worth was claimed to be $283 million (AU).

Creasy had discovered the Bronzewing Gold Mine, and had sold the mine in the 1990s.  By the early 2000s he had had a ten year long legal battle over Bronzewing South tenements with rival Leith Beal.

Many journalists fall back on terms such as Midas, and prospector, when describing Creasy's wealth and achievement in finding and investing in resources. Creasy pledged 500,000 towards the construction of a statue called Ascalon in Cathedral Square, Perth, and also contributed towards floating rocks in fountains in Forrest Place and the Carlisle operations of the Department of Mines Industry Regulation and Safety.

At the age of 74 in 2018, Creasy made claims of not retiring, but reducing investments and activities. He also has been identified as being very private, despite occasional insights from newspaper articles and avoiding media exposure, despite the very public controversies around The Cliffe.  Creasy has also supported publication of historical materials about Western Australian history.

Creasy has stakes in between 40-50 listed companies, most of which are junior explorers.

Net worth

References

Living people
Australian mining entrepreneurs
1944 births
People from Perth, Western Australia